Laura Chenel (born 1948–1949) is a cheese maker who was America's first commercial producer of goat cheese, and helped to popularize goat cheese in America. In 1979, she began producing chèvre in the Bay Area town of Sebastopol, California, after a fact-finding trip to visit goat cheese producers in France. After several months of working to sell her product to local markets (with mixed success, due to American unfamiliarity with goat cheeses at the time), she received her first major opportunity when Alice Waters of Chez Panisse in Berkeley, California placed a standing order for her cheese in 1980. Waters listed the cheese by name on her menu (as "Laura Chenel's Chèvre", in what may have been the first American instance of goat cheese salad), which provided Chenel with a great deal of publicity. Eventually, her operation would grow to sell over two million pounds of cheese per year. The company primarily manufactures fresh chèvre, although aged cheeses make up roughly 10% of its business. In 2006, Chenel sold the company to the Rians Group fr, a French corporation which has purchased multiple small farming operations, while retaining ownership of her herd of five hundred goats.

See also

 List of cheesemakers

References

External links
 
 Biography at starchefs.com
 Article at epicurean.com

1940s births
Living people
American women in business
Cheesemakers
People from Sebastopol, California
Food and drink in the San Francisco Bay Area
Agriculture in California
Dairy products companies in California
21st-century American women